Bill Latham  (born 29 October 1989) is a wheelchair basketball player from Australia. He was a member of the Australian national team that competed at the 2010  and 2014 Wheelchair Basketball World Championships that won gold medals.
At the 2012 Summer Paralympics he was part of the Australian men's wheelchair team that won silver. He was a member of the Rollers at the 2020 Summer Paralympics, his second Games.

Personal life

Born on 29 October 1989. As a five year old, Latham severely damaged his left leg in a tractor accident at his family property near Coffs Harbour, New South Wales. At the age of 13, Latham made the decision, with the support of his family, to have his left leg amputated below the knee.

Latham's great-grandfather Tedda Courtney who played rugby league for Australia and was the first coach of the Canterbury Bulldogs.

Basketball career
Before playing wheelchair basketball, he participated swimming, lawn bowls and athletics throwing - discus, javelin and shot put.

Latham is a 4.0 wheelchair basketball player and plays centre/forward. His achievements include silver in the 2012 Paralympics and gold in the 2014 and 2010 World Championships

He was part of the team sent to represent Australia in the 2016 Paralympics where they finished sixth.

In 2018, he was a member of the Rollers that won the bronze medal at 2018 Wheelchair Basketball World Championship in Hamburg, Germany.

At the 2020 Tokyo Paralympics, the Rollers finished fifth with a win–loss record of 4–4.

References

External links
 
 Bill Latham at Basketball Australia

1989 births
Paralympic silver medalists for Australia
Paralympic wheelchair basketball players of Australia
Wheelchair basketball players at the 2012 Summer Paralympics
Wheelchair basketball players at the 2016 Summer Paralympics
Wheelchair basketball players at the 2020 Summer Paralympics
Living people
Medalists at the 2012 Summer Paralympics
Paralympic medalists in wheelchair basketball